It Takes Two is the debut studio album by American hip hop duo Rob Base and DJ E-Z Rock. It was released on August 9, 1988 through Profile Records. Recording sessions took place at Hillside Sound Studio in Englewood, New Jersey. Production was handled by William Hamilton, Donald Dee Bowden, Thomas Dean, Rob Base and DJ E-Z Rock. Both the album and the title track/single were certified platinum by the Recording Industry Association of America on June 12, 1989 and December 28, 1989, respectively.

The album produced two minor hit singles, "It Takes Two" and "Joy and Pain", and the #1 Dance single produced by David "DJ" Wynn, "Get on the Dance Floor".

Track listing

Charts

Certifications

References

External links

1988 debut albums
Profile Records albums
Rob Base & DJ E-Z Rock albums